Keep the Giraffe Burning is a 1977 science fiction short story collection by John Sladek.

Contents 
Foreword
Elephant with Wooden Leg
The Design
The Face
The Master Plan
Flatland
A Game of Jump
The Hammer of Evil, or Career Opportunities at the Pascal Business School
The Locked Room
Another Look
Space Shoes of the Gods: An Archaeological Revelation
The Poets of Millgrove, Iowa
The Commentaries
Heavens Below: Fifteen Utopias (overall title for 15 short-short stories)
Getting There Is (n-1/n)th the Fun
The Bright Side
Mr. and Ms. America
Empty Promise
The Paradise Problem
What Changed Doyster's Mind
Handout
Assessment
Art News
Pax Gurney
A Fable
Utopia: A Financial Report
Utopiary
Luck
A Picnic
Scenes from Rural Life
The Secret of the Old Custard
Undecember
The Great Wall of Mexico
Afterword

External links 

1977 short story collections
Science fiction short story collections
Panther Books books